Getashen (also, Kalagar; until 1946, Dzhafarabat and Jafarabad) is a town in the Armavir Province of Armenia on the border with Turkey.

Development programs 
Starting 2006 Children of Armenia Fund entered getashen with a holistic approach to advance the rural village life.

The programs implemented include Crufts Clubs, Student Councils, Debate Clubs, Aflatoun Social-Financial Education Club, professional orientation, Social and Psychological Assistance, Support to School Psychologists, Support to Children with Learning Difficulties, Drama Therapy, Healthy Lifestyle Education, School Nutrition & Brushodromes, Free Dental Care, Women Health Screenings, Support for Reproductive Health.

Children of Armenia Fund also renovated village facilities such as School, Creativity Lab, Cafeteria and Brushodrome, Green house, Agro-school.

See also 
Armavir Province
Children of Armenia Fund

References

Further reading 

World Gazeteer: Armenia – World-Gazetteer.com

External links 
 Գյուղացին չի կարողանում եւ չի ուզում մշակել հողը, an article in Hetq Online about the troubles of farmers in Getashen 

Populated places in Armavir Province